Omaira Molina (born 7 September 1991) is a Venezuelan karateka. She won the silver medal in the women's kumite +68 kg event at the 2019 Pan American Games held in Lima, Peru.

In 2015, she won one of the bronze medals in the kumite -68 kg event at the Pan American Games held in Toronto, Canada. In 2018, she won the gold medal in the women's kumite +68 kg event at the Central American and Caribbean Games held in Barranquilla, Colombia.

As of 2022, Molina is signed to Karate Combat, where she fights in the women's bantamweight division. She currently holds a 4-0-0 record.

Achievements

Karate Combat record

References 

Living people
1991 births
Place of birth missing (living people)
Venezuelan female karateka
Pan American Games medalists in karate
Pan American Games silver medalists for Venezuela
Pan American Games bronze medalists for Venezuela
Medalists at the 2015 Pan American Games
Medalists at the 2019 Pan American Games
Karateka at the 2015 Pan American Games
Karateka at the 2019 Pan American Games
Competitors at the 2014 Central American and Caribbean Games
Competitors at the 2018 Central American and Caribbean Games
Central American and Caribbean Games gold medalists for Venezuela
Central American and Caribbean Games bronze medalists for Venezuela
Central American and Caribbean Games medalists in karate
21st-century Venezuelan women